FUBAR (Fucked Up Beyond All Repair/Recognition) is an upcoming spy-adventure television series created by Nick Santora for Netflix. It stars Arnold Schwarzenegger in his first leading role in a scripted television series produced by Skydance Television and Blackjack Films. The series is set to premiere on May 25, 2023.

Premise
Luke and his daughter Emma have lied to each other for years, both of them not knowing the other is a CIA operative.  Once they both learn the truth, they realize they don't actually know anything about each other.

Cast

Main
 Arnold Schwarzenegger as Luke
 Monica Barbaro as Emma
 Jay Baruchel as Carter
 Aparna Brielle as Tina
 Andy Buckley as Donnie
 Milan Carter as Barry
 Fortune Feimster as Ruth (or Roo)
 Barbara Eve Harris as Dot
 Gabriel Luna as Boro
 Fabiana Udenio as Tally
 Travis Van Winkle as Aldon

Recurring
 Devon Bostick as Oscar
 David Chinchilla as Cain Khan
 Rachel Lynch as Romi
 Stephanie Sy as Sandy
 Scott Thompson as Dr. Louis Pfeffer
 Adam Pally as The Great Dane

Guest stars
 Dustin Milligan
 Tom Arnold

Episodes

Production 
Skydance Television first announced that it was developing an untitled spy television series for Arnold Schwarzenegger to star in and make his scripted television debut in August 2020.  Shortly afterward, Monica Barbaro was cast as the lead opposite Schwarzenegger in the series where a father and daughter are both CIA agents, unbeknownst to the other.  Netflix won the rights for the project that November and had ordered eight episodes of the series by May 2021. The cast was expanded in April 2022, announcing several regular and recurring roles. Phil Abraham was announced as director and executive producer of the pilot episode in May, and a July casting announcement added Adam Pally. While in production, the series used the working titles Utap and FUBAR.

Filming began in April 2022 in Antwerp, Belgium around Grote Markt. Additional filming took place in Toronto. In September 2022, filming is wrapped up with the series now titled FUBAR.

Release 
FUBAR is set to be released to stream on Netflix on May 25, 2023.

References

External links 
 
 

2020s American drama television series

English-language Netflix original programming
Espionage television series
American spy drama television series
Upcoming drama television series
Upcoming Netflix original programming
Television series about the Central Intelligence Agency
Television series by Skydance Television